Vivek was an Indian actor and  comedian who worked mainly in Tamil cinema. He won three Filmfare Best Comedian Awards for his performances in Run, Saamy and Perazhagan. In April 2009, Vivek received the Padma Shri award by the Government of India for his contribution to the arts. He was introduced to filmdom by renowned director K. Balachander.

This is a complete list of films acted by comedian Vivek.

Filmography

Films

Actor
All films are in Tamil, unless otherwise noted.

Television

As singer

As lyricist

As voice actor

References

Indian filmographies
Male actor filmographies
|}